1999 Emmy Awards may refer to:

 51st Primetime Emmy Awards, the 1999 Emmy Awards ceremony honoring primetime programming during June 1998 – May 1999
 26th Daytime Emmy Awards, the 1999 Emmy Awards ceremony honoring daytime programming during 1998
 27th International Emmy Awards, honoring international programming

Emmy Award ceremonies by year